Dinematichthys is a genus of viviparous brotulas. Its name comes from Greek, meaning two-filamented fish (di means two, nema filament and ichthys fish).

Species
There are currently two recognized species in this genus:
 Dinematichthys iluocoeteoides Bleeker, 1855 (Yellow pigmy brotula)
 Dinematichthys trilobatus Møller & Schwarzhans, 2008

References

Bythitidae